

Universities
 ICFAI University, Mizoram
 Mizoram University

Medical College
Zoram Medical College

Colleges

College of Teachers Education, Aizawl
College of Veterinary Sciences and Animal Husbandry, Selesih (constituent college)
Government Aizawl College
Government Aizawl North College
Government Aizawl West College
Government Champhai College
Government Hrangbana College
Government J. Buana College
Government J. Thankima College
Government Johnson College
Government Kolasib College
Government Mizoram Law College
Government Saiha College
Government Serchhip College
Government T. Romana College
Government Zirtiri Residential Science College

Government Mamit College
Government Saitual College
Government Lawngtlai College
Government Khawzawl College
Government Hnahthial College
Government Zawlnuam College
Helen Lowry College of Arts & Commerce
Kamalanagar College
Lunglei Government College
Mizoram College of Nursing
National Institute of Electronics and Information Technology, Aizawl
Pachhunga University College (constituent college)
St. Xavier's College, Lengpui
Regional Institute of Paramedical and Nursing Aizawl
Higher and Technical Institute of Mizoram

Autonomous institution 
 National Institute of Technology Mizoram
 National Institute of Electronics and Information Technology Aizawl

References 

Education in Mizoram
Mizoram
Education